Isaac Mulindwa is a businessman and former politician in Uganda. He is the founder and owner of Makinawa Motors Limited, an automobile dealership based in the Kololo neighborhood in Uganda's capital, Kampala.

History
He was born in Ruharo Village in modern-day Mbarara Municipality, circa 1941. He is a descendant of the Baganda chiefs who went to Ankole at the invitation of the prime minister of Ankole at that time, Nuwa Mbaguta in 1886. One of Mulindwa's great-grandfathers was a "Gombolola chief (Sabawali) of Buyanja Sub-county in Igara, now Bushenyi District".

Mulindwa attended Kabwohe Muslim Primary School in 1949. He then studied at Kibuli High School for his high school education. He then attended Arapai Agricultural College in Soroti, which today is part of Busitema University.

In the late 1950s, Mulindwa opened a hides and skins shed at Kabwohe. He also opened a store dealing in beans, millet, maize, and coffee. In 1960, he relocated to Stanleyville in the then Belgian Congo, living there for two years. In that period, he persuaded five Congolese jazz bands to relocate to Uganda, earning a commission of between UGX:4,000 to UGX:6,000 on each band. He opened Makinawa Motors in 1964 and ran it successfully until 1980 when he was forced to go into political exile, spending five years there before returning to Uganda in 1985.

Businesses and investments
He owns or controls the following businesses:

 A coffee factory in Lukuli, Makindye Division, Kampala, opened in 1963.
 Makinawa Motors Limited, Kololo, Kampala Central Division, opened in 1964.
 A mixed commercial agriculture and dairy farm in Matugga, Wakiso District.
 A rice processing factory at the farm in Matugga.
 A residential house in Ruharo, Mbarara, Uganda
 A residential house in Kololo, Kampala, Uganda.

Political career
In 1955, he was one of the founders of the Uganda Freedom Movement (UFM) with Augustine Kamya, Mary Nkata, and Godfrey Binaisa. UFM was at the forefront of organizing the boycott of Asian businesses and establishments, to protest discrimination and racism practiced by whites and Asians against Africans.

Personal life
In 1962, Mulindwa married Safina Nnaku and together, they produced six children.

See also
 List of wealthiest people in Uganda

References

External links
Webpage of Busitema University

1941 births
Living people
Ganda people
Ugandan Muslims
Ugandan businesspeople
Ugandan politicians
People from Mbarara District
People from Western Region, Uganda
Busitema University alumni